Stanley Dorfman is an English film director and producer. Dorfman was active in Great Britain throughout the 1960s and 1970s. He was the original co-producer and director for the TV music show Top of the Pops and created and directed the BBC's In Concert series.

He later moved to the United States, where he directed music videos by many major artists.

Dorfman is currently based in Los Angeles.

References

External links
Stanley Dorfman filmography

English music video directors
Living people
Year of birth missing (living people)
Place of birth missing (living people)
People from Los Angeles